Anderson Daniel Plata Guillén (born 8 November 1990) is a Colombian footballer who plays as forward for Saudi Arabian club Al-Jabalain.

Career
Plata began his career with second division club Valledupar in 2011. In September 2011, he transferred to Deportivo Pereira, playing three seasons there until moving to South Korean outfit Daejeon Citizen on 19 June 2013, where he made 21 appearances but only scored once. 
In January 2014, he moved back to Colombia and  joined Millonarios on a one-year loan deal with an option to permanent switch for a further year. In 2015, he played with Atlético Huila.

In June 2016, he joined Independiente Santa Fe. On 10 August 2016, Plata played 15 minutes as he won his first title with Santa Fe, the Suruga Bank Championship against Kashima Antlers. He scored two goals in the playoffs against Independiente Medellín and Atlético Nacional to help guide Santa Fe into the final of the 2016 FInalizacion tournament, which they won against Deportes Tolima for Plata's first league title in his career, and second with Santa Fe. In 2017, Santa Fe made the final again, in the Torneo Finalizacion, but lost to Millonarios. In August 2018, Plata left Santa Fe.

On 16 August 2018, he joined Athletico Paranaense on a one year contract. In December, Paranaense won the Copa Sudamericana, but Plata wasn't able to play because he already played part of the competition with Santa Fe. His spell at the Brazilian club was short-lived and under expectations, only playing 8 games without scoring any goals, mainly due to an injury he suffered. In June 2019, he joined Deportes Tolima. In June 2021, he won his first title with Tolima, playing in both legs of the victory against Millonarios in the final of the league.

On 8 August 2022, Plata joined Saudi Pro League club Al-Adalah on a two-year deal. On 25 January 2023, Plata was released from his contract. On 30 January 2023, Plata joined Saudi First Division League side Al-Jabalain.

Style of Play 
Anderson Plata likes to take advantage of his speed and dribbling, which has developed him into a winger that likes to take on defenders. However, he has been criticized for his decision making sometimes, as he would make passes at the wrong time or have poor accuracy when taking shots, although he improved these things as he aged.

Honours

Independiente Santa Fe 

 Categoría Primera A: 2016-II
 Suruga Bank Championship: 2016

Deportes Tolima 

 Categoria Primera A: 2021-I

References

External links
 
 

1990 births
Living people
Colombian footballers
Association football forwards
Categoría Primera A players
Categoría Primera B players
K League 1 players
Campeonato Brasileiro Série A players
Saudi Professional League players
Saudi First Division League players
Deportivo Pereira footballers
Millonarios F.C. players
Atlético Huila footballers
Independiente  Santa Fe footballers
Daejeon Hana Citizen FC players
Club Athletico Paranaense players
Deportes Tolima footballers
Al-Adalah FC players
Al-Jabalain FC players
Colombian expatriate footballers
Colombian expatriate sportspeople in South Korea
Colombian expatriate sportspeople in Brazil
Colombian expatriate sportspeople in Saudi Arabia
Expatriate footballers in South Korea
Expatriate footballers in Brazil
Expatriate footballers in Saudi Arabia
People from La Guajira Department